The Mallows, also known as Alida Chanler Emmet and Christopher Temple Emmet Estate, is a historic home located at Head of the Harbor in Suffolk County, New York.  It is a Colonial Revival estate home designed in 1906 by architect Charles A. Platt (1861–1933).  It is an imposing structure, finished in stucco with powerful wooden detailing at the principal doorways, roof cornice and porch. It is a large rectangular mass, two full stories in height, seven bays long, with projecting wings.  It features a simple pitched gable roof and a two-story porch on the west wing with large Doric order piers.

It was added to the National Register of Historic Places in 1993.

References

Houses on the National Register of Historic Places in New York (state)
Colonial Revival architecture in New York (state)
Houses completed in 1906
Houses in Suffolk County, New York
National Register of Historic Places in Suffolk County, New York
1906 establishments in New York (state)